Sidney E. Zion (November 14, 1933, Passaic, NJ – August 2, 2009, Brooklyn) was an American writer.  His works include  Markers, Begin from Beginning, Read All about It, Trust Your Mother but Cut the Cards, (collections of his columns),  Loyalty and Betrayal: The Story of the American Mob and Markers (a novel). He co-authored The Autobiography of Roy Cohn.  He also was a co-founder and co-editor of Scanlan's Monthly magazine.

Biography
Zion graduated from University of Pennsylvania and Yale Law School, working as a trial lawyer until becoming Assistant US Attorney for New Jersey in 1961. He then turned to journalism and writing novels.   He worked for various New York publications, including  The New York Times, New York Daily News, New York Post and New York Magazine.  In 1971, Zion revealed that Daniel Ellsberg was the source of the Pentagon Papers, the classified study on the history of United States' political and military involvement in Vietnam from 1945 to 1967. It detailed the Johnson Administration's deceit in Vietnam, and at that time was being published by the Times and The Washington Post. Zion, who was not affiliated with any news organization at the time, made the revelation on a popular New York City radio show.  Many journalists regarded his disclosure of Ellsberg's identity as a breach of professional ethics, and Zion said he was considered a "pariah" by journalism colleagues for several years afterward.

He was a recipient of the Ben Hecht Journalism Award. He was married to Elsa H. Zion; their daughter, Libby Zion, died at age 18 in New York Hospital. Her death and the subsequent investigation and trial led to improvements in hospital residents' working conditions. Sidney Zion died in 2009 after a brief battle with cancer.

He owned a steakhouse during the early 1980s called Broadway Joe that catered to theater people. It was located on West 46th Street.

Mr. Zion was a Zionist and Jew who believed very strongly in the state of Israel. He was a devout Jew in his private life.

Mr. Zion served on the Board of Directors (as well as council) of The Players in New York City, fighting anti-smoking laws passed during the Bloomberg Administration, believing those laws to be unconstitutional.

References

External links
 Washington Post report
 "Deadlines at dawn: The many lives of Sidney Zion," Thrive, February 2007

1933 births
2009 deaths
American columnists
The New York Times writers
Deaths from cancer in New York (state)
American male journalists
20th-century American journalists
20th-century American male writers
21st-century American journalists
21st-century American male writers
People from Passaic, New Jersey
Journalists from New Jersey
University of Pennsylvania alumni
Yale Law School alumni